El Rufián is a 1960 Argentine film directed by Daniel Tinayre.

Cast
Egle Martin	... 	Isabel-Florelle
Carlos Estrada	... 	Hector
Óscar Rovito	... 	Raul
Nathán Pinzón	... 	Andres
Aída Luz	... 	Berta
Aníbal Pardeiro	... 	Dr. Marco
Daniel de Alvarado	... 	Dr. Danieli
Nelly Beltrán
Cayetano Biondo
Homero Cárpena
Carlos Cotto
Lucio Deval	... 	Policia 1
Zulema Esperanza
Ovidio Fuentes
Eduardo de Labar
Carmen Llambí
Gaston Marchetto
Víctor Martucci
Inés Moreno
Luis Orbegozo
Gilberto Peyret	... 	Policía 2
Alberto Quiles
Martha Roldán
Orestes Soriani
Isidro Fernán Valdez
Oscar Valicelli	... 	Angel
Marcos Zucker

External links
 

1960 films
1960s Spanish-language films
Argentine black-and-white films
Films directed by Daniel Tinayre
1960s Argentine films